Al-Hamrat is a village in central Syria, administratively part of the Homs Governorate. It is situated in a plain along the western fringes of the Syrian Desert. Nearby localities include the subdistrict center of al-Riqama to the north, Shayrat to the northeast, Sadad to the south, Hisyah to the southwest and Jandar to the northwest. According to the Central Bureau of Statistics (CBS), al-Hamrat had a population of 1,624 in the 2004 census. It has Syria's only Spoonbill breeding colony.

References

Populated places in Homs District
Villages in Syria